The Friends Meetinghouse and School is an historic Quaker meeting house and adjacent school building at the corner of Schermerhorn Street and Boerum Place in the Boerum Hill neighborhood of Brooklyn, New York City.

The meeting house, at 110 Schermerhorn Street, was built in 1857 and is a -story building built of red brick with brownstone details. Its design is attributed to Charles T. Bunting.

The school, located at 112 Schermerhorn Street, was built in 1902 and is a three-story red brick building located adjacent to the meeting house, at 112 Schermerhorn Street. It was designed by William Tubby, a prominent Brooklyn architect, to house the Brooklyn Friends School. Tubby was himself a Quaker and an early graduate of the school.

The meeting house remains in regular use as a house of worship by the Brooklyn Meeting of the Religious Society of Friends. The Brooklyn Friends School moved to another site nearby in 1973. , the school building houses Brooklyn Frontiers High School, an alternative school operated by the New York City Department of Education.

The meeting house was designated a New York City landmark in 1981, and the meeting house and school together were listed on the National Register of Historic Places in 1982.

References
Notes

External links

Official website

Churches in Brooklyn
School buildings on the National Register of Historic Places in New York City
Neoclassical architecture in New York City
Churches completed in 1857
19th-century Quaker meeting houses
Properties of religious function on the National Register of Historic Places in Brooklyn
Quaker meeting houses in New York City
Boerum Hill
National Register of Historic Places in Brooklyn
1857 establishments in New York (state)
New York City Designated Landmarks in Brooklyn
Underground Railroad in New York (state)
African-American history in New York City